Maleševo or Maleshevo may refer to:
 Maleševo (Golubac), a village in municipality of Golubac, Serbia
 Maleševo (Rekovac), a village in municipality of Rekovac, Serbia
 Maleshevo Mountain (in Bulgarian) or Maleševo Mountain (in Macedonian), a mountain in Bulgaria and North Macedonia
 Maleshevo Cove

See also  
 Mališevo, a settlement
 Mileševo (disambiguation)
 Miloševo (disambiguation)